Toxorhina alexanderi is a species of limoniid crane fly in the family Limoniidae. This tropical African species is known from a specimen taken in The Gambia, stored at the Lund Museum of Zoology Insect Collection at Lund University in Lund, Sweden.

References

Limoniidae
Insects described in 1981